The Reykjavík Tournament is an annual pre-season football tournament in Iceland. The tournament involves nine of Reykjavík's top football sides from the top two leagues in Iceland, Úrvalsdeild karla and 1. deild, and uses a combination of group and knockout rounds to determine which team is the winner of the tournament. Currently, matches begin in January, with tournament concluding in February. 

Valur are the defending champions, having defeated Fjölnir 1–0 in the 2017 final.

Champions

By year

By club
A total of 10 clubs have appeared in the final, of whom 9 have won the competition. The most successful club regarding appearances and victories is KR, while Víkingur are the only side to have appeared in a final and not won, finishing runners-up on 3 occasions. 

The most recent winner is KR, who defeated Valur 2–0 in the 2020 final.

References

External links
REYKJAVIK CUP at Soccerway.com
Winners since 2014 at Soccerway.com

Úrvalsdeild karla (football)
Sport in Reykjavík
Football competitions in Iceland